Founded in 1943, Marotta Controls, Inc. is one of the technology businesses in New Jersey, specializing in the design, manufacture and integration of precision control components and systems.  It offers valves, manifolds, power conversion, motor drives and control actuation systems for military and commercial applications.

History

Marotta was founded in 1943 as The Marotta Engineering Company. Early manufacturing sub-contracts for prime contractors such as General Electric Corporation and RCA enabled Marotta to gain experience in what was to become a particular area of expertise – precision valves and machined components for the rocket and guided missile industry.

Locations
Marotta Corporate Headquarters 
Montville, Morris County, New Jersey, United States

References

Aerospace companies of the United States
Defense companies of the United States
Manufacturing companies established in 1943
Companies based in Morris County, New Jersey